Bent Erik Sørensen (born 13 October 1941), is a Danish physicist, distinguished mainly by research into future forms of renewable energy. He is currently Professor Emeritus in the Department of Environmental, Social and Spatial Change in Roskilde University, Denmark, and president of Novator Advanced Technology Consulting.

Biography
Sørensen gained his MSc in physics and mathematics in 1965 and was awarded a PhD in 1974 by the Niels Bohr Institute in Copenhagen, where he worked until 1980, when he became professor at Roskilde University. He has undertaken sabbatical appointments in Japan, France, USA and Australia and has presented at numerous international events.

He received the Australian Government Award for Eminent European Scientists in 1982 and the European Solar Prize in 2002. In 1989 he was knighted by Queen Margrethe II of Denmark.

Publications
Sørensen has published over five hundred articles, reports and papers, and has written a number of books, including:

See also
List of people associated with renewable energy

References

20th-century Danish  physicists
21st-century Danish physicists
People associated with renewable energy
1941 births
Living people